Red Hot! is one of the many Sammy Hagar compilation albums from his Capitol Records era. This one compiling material from his two live albums released for the label, All Night Long and Live 1980. Tracks 1-6 were taken from All Night Long and tracks 7-11 were taken from Live 1980.

Song information
This compilation does nothing to correct the erred track break from Live 1980. Here though, the song "In The Night", which contained the main verse of two simultaneously played tracks, is omitted from this collection. What remains is the rest of "The Danger Zone", which is a Gary Pihl keyboard solo. The song "The Danger Zone" as it appears on the Danger Zone album is not on this, or any, live release.

Cd Track listing
 "I've Done Everything for You" (Sammy Hagar) - 3:25
 "Red" (John Carter, Sammy Hagar) - 4:57
 "Rock 'n' Roll Weekend" (Sammy Hagar) - 3:42
 "Make It Last/Reckless" (Sammy Hagar) - 6:40
 "Turn Up the Music" (John Carter, Sammy Hagar) - 5:47
 "Bad Motor Scooter" (Sammy Hagar) - 7:07
 "Love or Money" (Sammy Hagar) - 3:59
 "Plain Jane" (Sammy Hagar) - 2:27
 "20th Century Man" (Sammy Hagar, Gary Pihl) - 4:03
 "The Danger Zone" (Sammy Hagar) - 5:00
 "Space Station #5" (Sammy Hagar, Ronnie Montrose) - 4:28

Cassette track listing
Side one
"Red" (John Carter, Sammy Hagar) – 4:57
"Bad Motor Scooter" (Sammy Hagar) – 7:07
"Turn Up the Music" (John Carter, Sammy Hagar) – 5:47

Side two
"Space Station #5" (Sammy Hagar, Ronnie Montrose) – 4:03
"Rock 'n' Roll Weekend" (Sammy Hagar) – 3:42
"20th Century Man" (Sammy Hagar, Gary Pihl) – 4:03
"Plain Jane" (Sammy Hagar) – 2:27
I've Done Everything for You (Sammy Hagar) – 3:25

Personnel 
 Sammy Hagar: lead vocals, guitar
 Bill Church: bass guitar, backing vocals
 Gary Pihl - keyboards (tracks 7–11), lead guitar, backing vocals
 Alan Fitzgerald: keyboards, backing vocals (tracks 1–6)
 Denny Carmassi: drums (tracks 1–6)
 Chuck Ruff: drums, backing vocals (tracks 7–11)

Sammy Hagar albums
1989 compilation albums
Capitol Records compilation albums